Ove Kinnmark (24 December 1944 – 26 October 2015) was a Swedish chess master.

At the beginning of his career, he won Swedish Junior championships at Växjö 1958, and played at Halle 1963 (zonal).
He represented thrice Sweden in Chess Olympiads (1966, 1970, 1974).

References

External links
 Chessgames.com
 365Chess.com

1944 births
2015 deaths
Swedish chess players